Norbert Alban Eder (7 November 1955 – 2 November 2019) was a German footballer who played mainly as a defender.

In a 14-year professional career, he played in 433 games (33 goals) both major levels of German football combined (286/11 in the Bundesliga), representing 1. FC Nürnberg and Bayern Munich.

Eder appeared with West Germany at the 1986 World Cup.

Club career
Born in Bibergau, Dettelbach, Eder joined 1. FC Nürnberg's youth system at the age of 17. The following year, he was promoted to the first team, going on to appear in four consecutive second division seasons, achieving promotion to the Bundesliga in 1977–78 but being immediately relegated back; during his first years, he played mostly as a midfielder.

In the 1984 summer, aged almost 29, Eder signed with FC Bayern Munich, for 150,000 Deutsche Mark. During his four-year spell, he never played in less than 32 league games, going on to win three consecutive national championships. In the 1986–87 season, he appeared in 44 official games, including nine in the season's European Cup – he played the full 90 minutes in the final 1–2 loss against F.C. Porto in Vienna.

Eder retired in June 1989, after one year in Switzerland with FC Zürich. In the following decades he worked as a manager, exclusively in amateur football.

International career
Eder made his debut for West Germany on 11 May 1986, in a friendly game with Yugoslavia played in Bochum (1–1).

He was picked by manager Franz Beckenbauer for that year's FIFA World Cup, playing all the matches and minutes for the Mannschaft – save for five minutes in the quarterfinals against Mexico – as it finished runner-up.

Honours
1. FC Nürnberg
 2. Bundesliga: 1979–80
 DFB-Pokal: runner-up 1981–82

Bayern Munich
 Bundesliga: 1984–85, 1985–86, 1986–87
 DFB-Pokal: 1985–86; runner-up 1984–85
 European Cup: runner-up 1986–87
 DFB-Supercup: 1987

Germany
 FIFA World Cup: runner-up 1986

References

External links
 
 
 

1955 births
2019 deaths
German footballers
Footballers from Bavaria
Association football defenders
Bundesliga players
2. Bundesliga players
1. FC Nürnberg players
FC Bayern Munich footballers
Swiss Super League players
FC Zürich players
Germany international footballers
Germany B international footballers
1986 FIFA World Cup players
German football managers
West German expatriate footballers
West German expatriate sportspeople in Switzerland
Expatriate footballers in Switzerland
West German footballers